Garner Handy Tullis (born 1939) was an American born artist residing in Pietrarubbia, Italy, since the September 11 attacks in 2001.

Biography 
Garner Tullis was born in Cincinnati, Ohio,  the son of the industrialist and civic leader Richard Barclay Tullis (1913–1999) and his wife, the painter Chaillé Handy, daughter of Henry Jamison Handy. Both endowed the Chaillé H. and Richard B. Tullis Principal Viola Chair of the Cleveland Orchestra, currently occupied by Robert Vernon. Garner Tullis has two siblings, Sarah ("Sallie") and Barclay.

Tullis attended Principia College, and afterwards studied at the University of Pennsylvania (B.A. 1963; B.F.A. 1964), where he was taught by the architect Louis Kahn; the sculptor Jacques Lipchitz; and such legendary figures of the New York school as Emilio Vedova, Robert Motherwell, Barnett Newman, David Smith and Mark Rothko. Awarded an extended grant to Italy by the U.S.-Italy Fulbright Commission, he was able to travel throughout Europe before he studied at Stanford University under a Carnegie Fellowship (M.A. 1967). In 1972, he founded the International Institute of Experimental Printmaking, where he worked together with such notable artists as Richard Diebenkorn, Sam Francis, Helen Frankenthaler, Robert Mangold, Kenneth Noland, Dorothea Rockburne, Robert Ryman, Sean Scully, and William G. Tucker, as well as hundreds of other painters and sculptors, including many younger figures.

Tullis taught at Bennington College, California State University, Stanislaus, University of California, Berkeley and Davis, as well as at Harvard University. Amongst others, his works belong to the collections of the Cleveland Museum of Art, the Museum of Modern Art in New York, the San Francisco Museum of Modern Art and of the Philadelphia Museum of Art.

Tullis has three sons and one daughter. His son Richard (b. 1962) also became a printmaker.

Literature 
 David Carrier: Garner Tullis and the Art of Collaboration; New York, NY, US, 1998.

References and footnotes

External links 
 Official website
 Tully's workshops history, Richard Tullis
 
 New York Times Obituary for Garner Tullis

20th-century American painters
American male painters
21st-century American painters
Italian printmakers
Italian sculptors
Italian male sculptors
20th-century Italian painters
Italian male painters
21st-century Italian painters
Principia College alumni
University of Pennsylvania alumni
Artists from Cincinnati
1939 births
Living people
20th-century American sculptors
American male sculptors
20th-century American printmakers
Sculptors from Ohio